Thandolwenkosi Mlilo also known as Thandakwenkosi Mlilo (born 16 June 1985) is a Zimbabwean woman cricketer. Mlilo was one of the cricketers to have played for Zimbabwe in its international debut in 2006. She represented Zimbabwe in the 2008 Women's Cricket World Cup Qualifier, 2013 ICC Women's World Twenty20 Qualifier and in the 2015 ICC Women's World Twenty20 Qualifier. In the 2008-09 season, she was awarded the Zimbabwean women's cricketer of the Year award.

References

External links 
 Profile at CricHQ
 Profile at Bigbashboard

1985 births
Living people
Zimbabwean women cricketers